The Gratiaen Prize is an annual literary prize for the best work of literary writing in English by a resident of Sri Lanka.  It was founded in 1992 by the Sri Lankan-born Canadian novelist Michael Ondaatje with the money he received as joint-winner of the Booker Prize for his novel The English Patient. The prize is named after Ondaatje's mother, Doris Gratiaen. 

Administered by the Gratiaen Trust based in Sri Lanka, the Gratiaen Prize accepts printed books and manuscripts in a range of genres including fiction, poetry, drama, creative prose and literary memoir. Entries may be submitted by both authors and publishers. Submissions are accepted between 1 and 31 December in a given year and are assessed by a panel of three judges appointed by the trust who are required to short-list three to five entries. The short-list event (open to the public) is usually held in April and hosted by the British Council in Colombo. The gala at which the winner is announced is held some weeks later at a venue selected by the trust and the event sponsors and is for invitees only.

The prize could be awarded for a translated work until 2003, when the trust established the H.A.I. Goonetileke Prize, which is awarded every second year for a work translated into English from Sinhala or Tamil.

Winners
1993
 Carl Muller, The Jam Fruit Tree
 Lalitha Withanachchi, Wind Blows Over the Hills

1994
Punyakante Wijenaike, Amulet 

1995
 Sybil Wettasinghe, The Child in Me
 Rajiva Wijesingha, Servants

1996
Tissa Abeysekera, Bringing Tony Home

1997
Gamini Akmeemana, The Mirage

1998
Jeanne Thwaites, It's a Sunny Day on the Moon

1999
Neil Fernandopulle, Shrapnel
Visakesa Chandrasekaram, Forbidden Area

2000
Ruwanthi De Chickera, Middle of Silence

2001
Elmo Jayawardene, Sam’s Story
Sumathi Sivamohan, In the Shadow of the Gun/The Wicked Witch

2002
Vijita Fernando, Out of the Darkness

2003
Nihal De Silva, Road from Elephant Pass

2004
Jagath Kumarasinghe, Kider Chetty Street

2005
Delon Weerasinghe, Thicker Than Blood

2006
Senaka Abeyratne, 3 Star K
Isankya Kodittuwakku, The Banana Tree Crisis

2007
Vivimarie Vanderpoorten, Nothing Prepares You

2008
Shehan Karunatilaka, Chinaman: The Legend of Pradeep Mathew

2009
Prashani Rambukwella, Mythil's Secret

2010
Sakuntala Sachithanandan, On the Streets and Other Revelations

2011
Madhubhashini Disanayake-Ratnayake, There's Something I Have to Tell You

2012
Lal Meddawattegedera, Playing Pillow Talk at MGK

2013
Malinda Seneviratne, Edges

2014
Vihanga Perera, Love and Protest

2015
Thiyagaraja Arasanayagam, White Lanterns: Wesak 2011

2016
 Charulatha Abeysekara Thewarathanthri, Stories

2017
 Jean Arasanayagam, The Life of the Poet

2018
 Arun Welandawe-Prematilleke, The One Who Loves You So

2019
 Andrew Fidel Fernando, Upon a Sleepless Isle

2020
 Carmel Miranda, Crossmatch

2021
 Ashok Ferrey, The Unmarriageable Man

References

External links 
Official website

1992 establishments in Sri Lanka
Awards established in 1992
Sri Lankan literary awards